Husky Memorial, also called Husky Monument, is a memorial for dead motorcyclists in California's Mojave Desert. It is on Bureau of Land Management (BLM) land, allowed by BLM but not officially sanctioned. It is a 21-mile ride from U.S. Route 395, the nearest paved road.

References

External links

Monuments and memorials in California